John T. "Jack" Gosling was an American physicist, whose research in heliophysics focused on the large-scale structure and magnetic topology of the solar wind, coronal mass ejections, solar wind and geomagnetic disturbances, magnetic reconnection, collisionless shocks, and particle acceleration in space. Gosling most recently performed research at University of Colorado and was an Elected Fellow of the American Association for the Advancement of Science.

Gosling was awarded the John Adam Fleming Medal at the AGU Spring Meeting Honors Ceremony, which was held on June 2, 2000, in Washington, D.C. The medal recognizes original research and technical leadership in geomagnetism, atmospheric electricity, aeronomy, space physics, and related sciences.

He was a member of the American Geophysical Union, American Physical Society, International Astronomical Union, and American Association for Advancement of Science.

Awards and honors 
 Technology Achievement Award - National Center for Atmospheric Research, 1974
 Distinguished Performance Award (Individual), Los Alamos National Laboratory, 1988
 Elected Fellow, American Geophysical Union, 1991
 Elected Fellow, Los Alamos National Laboratory, 1992
 Distinguished Performance Award (Large Team), Los Alamos National Laboratory, 1994
 Editors' Citation for Excellence in Refereeing:
 Journal of Geophysical Research - 1992, 1994, 1997
 Geophysical Research Letters – 1995, 2008
 Reviews of Geophysics - 2000
 John Adam Fleming Medal, American Geophysical Union, 2000
 Institute for Scientific Information recognition as one of most highly cited researchers in space sciences - 2002
 Parker/Bowie Lecture, American Geophysical Union, May, 2004. 
 Elected Fellow, American Association for Advancement of Science, 2007

Education 
 1956: Graduated from Buchtel High School, Akron, Ohio.
 1960: B. S. Physics (magna cum laude), Ohio University 
 1965: Ph.D. Physics, University of California - Berkeley

Professional work history 
 1965–1967: Post-doctoral staff member, Los Alamos Scientific Laboratory,
 1967–1975: Scientific Staff Member, High Altitude Observatory, National Center for Atmospheric Research
 1975–1992: Staff Member, Los Alamos National Laboratory
 1992–2005: Laboratory Fellow, Los Alamos National Laboratory
 1994–1998: Team Leader, Space Plasma Physics, Los Alamos National Laboratory 
 2005–2018: Senior Research Associate, Laboratory for Atmospheric and Space Physics, University of Colorado, Boulder
 2005–2018: Consultant to Southwest Research Institute

References

2018 deaths
Fellows of the American Association for the Advancement of Science
American astronomers
University of Colorado alumni
University of California, Berkeley alumni